The 2015 Asian Karate Championships are the 13th edition of the Asian Karate Championships, and were held in Yokohama, Japan from September 4 to September 6, 2015.

Medalists

Men

Women

Medal table

References
Results
Results

External links
 World Karate Federation 

Asian Championships
Asian Karate Championships
Asian Karate Championships
Asian Karate Championships
Sports competitions in Yokohama